The Voigt effect is a magneto-optical phenomenon which rotates and elliptizes linearly polarised light sent into an optically active medium. Unlike many other magneto-optical effects such as the Kerr or Faraday effect which are linearly proportional to the magnetization (or to the applied magnetic field for a non magnetized material), the Voigt effect is proportional to the square of the magnetization (or square of the magnetic field) and can be seen experimentally at normal incidence. There are several denominations for this effect in the literature: the Cotton–Mouton effect (in reference to French scientists Aimé Cotton and Henri Mouton), the Voigt effect (in reference to the German scientist Woldemar Voigt), and magnetic-linear birefringence. This last denomination is closer in the physical sense, where the Voigt effect is a magnetic birefringence of the material with an index of refraction parallel and perpendicular ) to the magnetization vector or to the applied magnetic field.

and in the transmission geometry:

Detailed calculation and an illustration are given in sections below.

Theory 

As with the other magneto-optical effects, the theory is developed in a standard way with the use of an effective dielectric tensor from which one calculates systems eigenvalues and eigenvectors. As usual, from this tensor, magneto-optical phenomena are described mainly by the off-diagonal elements.

Here, one considers an incident polarisation propagating in the z direction:  the electric field and a homogenously in-plane magnetized sample  where  is counted from the [100] crystallographic direction. The aim is to calculate  where  is the rotation of polarization due to the coupling of the light with the magnetization. We emphasized with the fact that it is because the light propagation vector is perpendicular to the magnetization plane that it is possible to see the Voigt effect.

Dielectric tensor 
Following the notation of Hubert, the generalized dielectric cubic tensor  take the following form:

At the present moment, there is no evidence that this approximation is not valid, as the observation of Voigt effect is rare because it is extremely small with respect to the Kerr effect.

Eigenvalues and eigenvectors 
To calculate the eigenvalues and eigenvectors, we consider the propagation equation derived from the Maxwell equations, with the convention :

When the magnetization is perpendicular to the propagation wavevector, on the contrary to the Kerr effect,  may have all his three components equals to zero making calculations rather more complicated and making Fresnels equations no longer valid.  A way to simplify the problem consists to use the electric field displacement vector  . Since  and  we have . The inconvenient is to deal with the inverse dielectric tensor which may be complicated to handle. Here calculation is made in the general case which is complicated mathematically to handle, however one can follow easily the demonstration by considering .

This led to the two eigenvalues corresponding the two refraction indices:

Reflection geometry

Continuity relation 
Knowing the eigenvectors and eigenvalues inside the material, one have to calculate  the reflected electromagnetic vector usually detected in experiments. Inside the medium, the electromagnetic field is decomposed on the derived eigenvectors . The system of equation to solve is:

The solution of this system of equation are:

Calculation of rotation angle 

The rotation angle  and the ellipticity angle  are defined from the ratio  with the two following formulae:

Using the two previously calculated components, one obtains:
 This gives for the Voigt rotation:
 where  is the difference of refraction indices.

Transmission geometry 
The calculation of the rotation of the Voigt effect in transmission is in principle equivalent to the one of the Faraday effect. In practice, this configuration is not used in general for ferromagnetic samples since the absorption length is weak in this kind of material. However, the use of transmission geometry is more common for paramagnetic liquid or cristal where the light can travel easily inside the material.

For convenience, the field will be added at the end of calculation in the magneto-optical parameters.

This gives:

In order to extract the Voigt rotation, we consider ,  and  real. Then we have to calculate the real part of (14). The resulting expression is then inserted in (8). In the approximation of no absorption, one obtains for the Voigt rotation in transmission geometry:

Illustration of Voigt effect in GaMnAs 

As an illustration of the application of the Voigt effect, we give an example in the magnetic semiconductor  where a large Voigt effect was observed. At low temperatures (in general for ) for a material with an in-plane magnetization,  exhibits a biaxial anisotropy with the magnetization aligned along (or close to) <100> directions.

A typical hysteresis cycle containing the Voigt effect is shown in figure 1. This cycle was obtained by sending a linearly polarized light along the [110] direction with an incident angle of approximately 3° (more details can be found in ), and measuring the rotation due to magneto-optical effects of the reflected light beam. In contrast to the common longitudinal/polar Kerr effect, the hysteresis cycle is even with respect to the magnetization, which is a signature of the Voigt effect. This cycle was obtained with a light incidence very close to normal, and it also exhibits a small odd part; a correct treatment has to be carried out in order to extract the symmetric part of the hysteresis corresponding to the Voigt effect, and the asymmetric part corresponding to the longitudinal Kerr effect.

In the case of the hysteresis presented here, the field was applied along the [1-10] direction. The switching mechanism is as follows:

 We start with a high negative field and the magnetization is close to the [-1-10] direction at position 1.
 The magnetic field is decreasing leading to a coherent magnetization rotation from 1 to 2
 At positive field, the magnetization switch brutally from 2 to 3 by nucleation and propagation of magnetic domains giving a first coercive field named here 
 The magnetization stay close to the state 3 while rotating coherently to the state 4, closer from the applied field direction.
 Again the magnetization switches abruptly from 4 to 5 by nucleation and propagation of magnetic domains. This switching is due to the fact that the final equilibrium position is closer from the state 5 with respect to the state 4 (and so his magnetic energy is lower). This gives another coercive field named 
 Finally the magnetization rotates coherently from the state 5 to the state 6.

The simulation of this scenario is given in the figure 2, with

As one can see, the simulated hysteresis is qualitatively the same with respect to the experimental one.

See also 
 Atomic line filter
 Cotton–Mouton effect
 Faraday effect

References

Further reading
 Zhao, Zhong-Quan. Excited state atomic line filters. Retrieved March 26, 2006.

Magneto-optic effects
Polarization (waves)